LRD can stand for:

The Labour Research Department, a United Kingdom trade union based research organisation
Liberian dollar by ISO 4217 currency code
Les Rallizes Dénudés
Les Rythmes Digitales
The IATA airport code for Laredo International Airport 
Long-range dependency
 Low Risk Distributor
Little Red Dot
The MTR station code for Light Rail Depot stop